Igor Drobnjak (born 21 April 2000) is a Montenegrin professional basketball player for Budućnost of the ABA League and the Montenegrin League. Drobnjak is member of young Montenegro national basketball team.

References

External links
  at aba-liga.com
  at euroleague.net

2000 births
Living people
ABA League players
KK Budućnost players
KK Mega Basket players
KK Studentski centar players
Montenegrin men's basketball players
Point guards